The Thousand Palms desert snail (Eremarionta millepalmarum) is a species of land snail in the family Helminthoglyptidae. This species is endemic to the United States. The specific epithet references Thousand Palms, California in the Colorado Desert.

References

Molluscs of the United States
Eremarionta
Gastropods described in 1930
Taxonomy articles created by Polbot